Rumdoodle Peak, elevation 875 m ASL, is a small but prominent mountain in the north-western part of the North Masson Range  of the Framnes Mountains in Antarctica, near Mawson Station.

It was named, around 1960, after the previously fictitious peak featured in the comic novel The Ascent of Rum Doodle by William Ernest Bowman.

Rumdoodle Hut

There is a small hut at the base (altitude 498m ASL), sleeping 5 people, and two permanently frozen lakes alongside, named Rumdoodle Lake and Lassitude Lake.

Rumdoodle Ski Landing Area

In late summer when sea ice conditions are unfavourable and the ski landing area (SLA) adjacent to Mawson can no longer be used, air transport operations are moved to Rumdoodle SLA, a field camp on the inland ice plateau 10 km from Mawson. 

Rumdoodle SLA has been in use since the 1950s. The glacial surface is subject to wind scouring, melt, snow accumulation and ablation, and requires annual inspection and preparation prior to use. It is accessible from Mawson by Hägglunds ground vehicles.

See also
 Airports in Antarctica

References

External links
 Australian Antarctic Gazetteer

Mountains of Mac. Robertson Land